Events from the year 1981 in Michigan.

The Associated Press (AP) selected the state's top sports stories as follows:
 The first championship boxing match between Thomas Hearns boxing match with Sugar Ray Leonard on September 16 and billed as "The Showdown";
 Eric Hipple's taking over as the Detroit Lions' quarterback after an injury to Gary Danielson;
 Michigan's victory over Washington in the 1981 Rose Bowl;
 The Detroit Pistons' selection of Isiah Thomas and Kelly Tripucka with the second and twelfth picks in the first round of the 1981 NBA draft;
 The Detroit Tigers' November 27 trade of Steve Kemp to the Chicago White Sox in exchange for Chet Lemon;
 The development of Kirk Gibson as a Major League Baseball player, compiling a .328 batting average for the Detroit Tigers;
 The death of University of Michigan football broadcaster Bob Ufer;
 The inaugural Michigan 500 automobile race at the Michigan International Speedway;
 The Detroit Red Wings' December 2 trade of Dale McCourt, Mike Foligno, and Brent Peterson to the Buffalo Sabres in exchange for Danny Gare, Jim Schoenfeld, and Derek Smith; and 
 The induction of Ernie Harwell into the Baseball Hall of Fame.

Office holders

State office holders

 Governor of Michigan: William Milliken (Republican)
 Lieutenant Governor of Michigan: James H. Brickley (Republican) 
 Michigan Attorney General: Frank J. Kelley (Democrat)
 Michigan Secretary of State: Richard H. Austin (Democrat)
 Speaker of the Michigan House of Representatives: Bobby Crim (Democrat)
 Majority Leader of the Michigan Senate: William Faust (Democrat)
 Chief Justice, Michigan Supreme Court:

Mayors of major cities
 Mayor of Detroit: Coleman Young
 Mayor of Grand Rapids: Abe L. Drasin
 Mayor of Flint: James W. Rutherford
 Mayor of Lansing: Gerald W. Graves/Terry John McKane
 Mayor of Ann Arbor: Louis Belcher (Republican)

Federal office holders

 U.S. Senator from Michigan: Donald W. Riegle Jr. (Democrat)
 U.S. Senator from Michigan: Carl Levin (Democrat) 
 House District 1: John Conyers (Democrat)
 House District 2: Carl Pursell (Republican)
 House District 3: Howard Wolpe (Republican)
 House District 4: David Stockman (Republican)/Mark D. Siljander (Republican)
 House District 5: Harold S. Sawyer (Republican)
 House District 6: Jim Dunn (Republican)
 House District 7: Dale Kildee (Democrat)
 House District 8: J. Bob Traxler (Democrat)
 House District 9: Guy Vander Jagt (Republican)
 House District 10: Donald J. Albosta (Democrat)
 House District 11: Robert William Davis (Republican)
 House District 12: David Bonior (Democrat)
 House District 13: George Crockett Jr. (Democrat)
 House District 14: Dennis M. Hertel (Democrat)
 House District 15: William D. Ford (Democrat)
 House District 16: John Dingell (Democrat)
 House District 17: William M. Brodhead (Democrat)
 House District 18: James Blanchard (Democrat)
 House District 19: William Broomfield (Republican)

Population

Sports

Baseball
 1981 Detroit Tigers season – Under manager Sparky Anderson, the Tigers compiled an 84-78 record and finished fourth in the American League East. The team's statistical leaders included Alan Trammell with a .300 batting average, Lance Parrish with 24 home runs, Steve Kemp with 101 RBIs, Jack Morris with 16 wins, and Pat Underwood with a 3.59 earned run average (ERA).

American football
 1981 Detroit Lions season – The Lions, under head coach Monte Clark, compiled an 8–8 record and finished second in the NFC Central Division. The team's statistical leaders included Eric Hipple with 2,358 passing yards, Billy Sims with 1,437 rushing yards, Freddie Scott with 1,022 receiving yards, and Eddie Murray with 121 points scored.
 1981 Michigan Wolverines football team – Under head coach Bo Schembechler, the Wolverines compiled a 9–3 record and were ranked No. 12 in the final AP Poll. The team's statistical leaders included Steve Smith with 1,661 passing yards and 72 points scored, Butch Woolfolk with 1,459 rushing yards, and Anthony Carter with 932 receiving yards.
 1981 Michigan State Spartans football team – Under head coach Muddy Waters, the Spartans compiled a 5–6 record. The team's statistical leaders included Bryan Clark with 1,521 passing yards, Aaron Roberts with 461 rushing yards, and Daryl Turner with 653 receiving yards.

Basketball
 1980–81 Detroit Pistons season – Under head coach Scotty Robertson, the Pistons compiled a 21–61 record and finished sixth in the NBA's Central Division. The team's statistical leaders included Phil Hubbard with 1,161 points and 586 rebounds and Ron Lee with 362 assists.
 1980–81 Michigan Wolverines men's basketball team – Under head coach Bill Frieder, the Wolverines compiled a 19–11 record. The team's statistical leaders include Mike McGee with 732 points, Thad Garner with 167 rebounds, and John Johnson with 105 assists.
 1980–81 Michigan State Spartans men's basketball team – Under head coach Jud Heathcote, the Spartans compiled a 13–14 record. The Spartans' statistical leaders included Jay Vincent with 609 points and 229 rebounds and Kevin Smith with 130 assists.
 1980–81 Detroit Titans men's basketball team – The Titans compiled a 9–18 record under head coach Willie McCarter.

Ice hockey
 1980–81 Detroit Red Wings season –  Under head coaches Ted Lindsay and Wayne Maxner, the Red Wings compiled a 19–43–18 record and finished fifth in the National Hockey League's Norris Division. The team's statistical leaders included John Ogrodnick with 35 goals and 73 points and Dale McCourt with 56 assists and 86 points. The team's regular goaltenders were Gilles Gilbert and Larry Lozinski.

Boxing

Other

Music and culture

Chronology of events

January

February

March

April

May

June

July

August

September

October

November

December

Births
 January 20 - Jason Richardson, basketball player, in Saginaw
 February 17 - T. J. Duckett, football running back, in Kalamazoo
 March 13 - Mozella, singer and songwriter, in Detroit
 March 25 - Daniel Vosovic, fashion designer, in Grand Rapids
 April 20 - Tom Leonard, 73rd Speaker of the Michigan House of Representatives (2017-2019)
 May 23 - Charles Rogers, football wide receiver, in Saginaw
 July 28 - Willie Green, basketball player and coach, in Detroit

Gallery of 1981 births

Deaths
 February 9 - Bill Haley, rock and roll pioneer and Highland Park native, at age 55 in Texas
 March 20 - Gee Walker, outfielder for Detroit Tigers (1931–37), at age 73 in Jackson, Mississippi
 March 20 - Sonny Red, jazz saxophonist, at age 48 in Detroit
 April 12 - Joe Louis, boxer and heavyweight champion, at age 66 in Nevada
 May 6 - Frank Fitzsimmons, president of the Teamsters 1967-81, at age 72 in San Diego
 October 18 - Bill Muncey, hydroplane racer, at age 52 in Acapulco, Mexico
 October 26 - Bob Ufer, track and field athlete and radio announcer, at age 61 in Ann Arbor
 November 22 - Corrado Parducci, architectural sculptor, at age 81

Gallery of 1981 deaths

See also
 History of Michigan
 History of Detroit

References